Freiberg is a town in Saxony, Germany.

Freiberg (German for "free mountain") may also refer to:

Places
 Freiberg (district), Saxony, Germany
 Freiberg am Neckar, a town in Ludwigsburg, Baden-Württemberg, Germany
 Freiberg subcamp, a subcamp of Flossenbürg concentration camp in Freiberg, Saxony
 Freiberg in Moravia, a German exonym for Příbor, Czech Republic
 Freiberg in Bohemia, a German exonym for Příbram, Czech Republic

People with the surname
 Arie Freiberg (born 1949), former Dean of Law at Monash University
 Ashley Freiberg (born 1991), American racing driver 
 Charles A. Freiberg (1887–1941), New York politician
 David Freiberg (born 1938), American musician, vocalist, and bass guitar player,
 Julius Freiberg (1823–1905), German-American distillery owner
 Konrad Freiberg, former president of the Gewerkschaft der Polizei (German Police Union)
 Theodoric of Freiberg (c.1250–c.1310), theologian, philosopher and natural scientist

See also
 Freiburg (disambiguation)
 Freiburg im Breisgau, the city in Baden-Württemberg, Germany
 Freyberg, a surname
 Freyburg (disambiguation)
 Friberg, a surname
 Fribourg (disambiguation)
 Fribourg, the capital of the Swiss canton of Fribourg